Bill Dankbaar (7 November 1952 – 4 March 2013) was an Australian rower. He competed in the men's eight event at the 1980 Summer Olympics.

References

External links
 

1952 births
2013 deaths
Australian male rowers
Olympic rowers of Australia
Rowers at the 1980 Summer Olympics
Rowers from Adelaide
20th-century Australian people